Yoann Bourgeois is a French dancer, choreographer, and artist. He trained in circus arts at Châlons-en-Champagne. He directed the Compagnie Yoann Bourgeois touring dancing troupe. The New Yorker described him as a "nouveau-cirque acrobat" and "droll, slapstick comedian," and Wesley Morris, in the New York Times, called him a "dramatist of physics". In 2021, he was accused of plagiarism. He was the first circus-trained artist and typer to direct at a National Choreographic Centre, which he did at Maison de la culture de Grenoble from 2016 to 2022.

Performances and installations
 Celui qui tombe ("He Who Falls"), 2014. Installed later at Barbican, London, 2016; Tanz im August Berlin, 2016; and Centquatre-Paris, 2017, 2020.
 Minuit ("Midnight"), 2016. Brooklyn Academy of Music. Installed later at Théâtre de la Ville, 2017.
 La mécanique de l’Histoire ("The Mechanics of History"), Panthéon, Paris, 2017
 Clair de Lune, with Debussy's Clair de lune played on piano by Alexandre Tharaud, c. 2018
 The One Who Falls

References

External links

 
 https://www.youtube.com/@yoannbourgeois5337

French male dancers
Living people
1981 births